Bruno Aleksander Salmiala (24 August 1890 in Gävle, Sweden as Bruno Sundström – 4 September 1981 in Helsinki) was a Finnish legal theorist and a far-right politician.

Legal career
Salmiala completed his PhD in jurisprudence at the University of Helsinki in 1924 and became a career academic, serving as a professor of criminal law at the institution from 1925 to 1959. He worked as the secretary of the Finnish Bar Association from 1920 to 1957 and was the executive editor of the legal journal Defensor Legis for 48 years (1920–1968). Salmiala also had an extensive career in the civil service, first as the deputy Parliamentary Ombudsman (1924–1928), then as a prosecutor (1926–1930) and finally as the head of the Criminal law institute (1955–1959).

Politics
Salmiala's first involvement in politics came in 1928 when he was appointed to the board of directors of Uusi Suomi, the organ of the conservative National Coalition Party. However his opinions shifted to the right and in 1932 he joined the Academic Karelia Society and became a founder member of the Patriotic People's Movement (IKL). He was appointed deputy leader in charge of organisation in the latter movement. An opponent of the violent tactics sometimes employed by the IKL due to his legal background he was nonetheless ideologically radical in contrast to the more conservative likes of Herman Gummerus and Erkki Räikkönen. He also represented Häme Province in the Parliament of Finland for the IKL from 1933 to 1944. Additionally, Salmiala served as an elected member of the Helsinki city council.

Later years
Salmiala dropped out of politics after the Second World War and, as well as continuing his academic work, was a member of the Finnish Radio and Television Committee. He lived to the age 91.

References

1890 births
1981 deaths
People from Gävle
Patriotic People's Movement (Finland) politicians
Members of the Parliament of Finland (1933–36)
Members of the Parliament of Finland (1936–39)
Members of the Parliament of Finland (1939–45)
20th-century Finnish lawyers
Finnish legal scholars
University of Helsinki alumni
Academic staff of the University of Helsinki
Finnish fascists